Eight ships of the Royal Navy have been named HMS Algerine:

 was a 10-gun schooner launched in 1810 and wrecked in 1813.
HMS Algerine was originally a 12-gun gun-brig, formerly the French Pierre Cézar. She was captured in 1808 and named . In 1814, she was converted into a 14-gun cutter under the name HMS Algerine and was sold in 1818. 
 was a 10-gun brig-sloop under the command of Commander Charles Wemyss when she was lost off Hydra in a squall in early 1826.
 was a 10-gun  launched in 1829 and sold in 1844.
 was an  wooden screw gunboat launched in 1857, sold into mercantile service in 1872 and broken up in 1894.
 was an  built by Harland and Wolff, launched in 1880, and displacing 835 tons. She was sold in 1892.
 was a  sloop launched in 1895, displacing 1050 tons.  She was on the China Station during the Boxer Rebellion, and was sold in 1919 and wrecked in 1923.
 was an  launched in 1941 and sunk in 1942.

References

Royal Navy ship names